WNYC (820 AM) is a nonprofit, non-commercial, public radio station licensed to New York City. The station is owned by New York Public Radio along with sister stations WNYC-FM and Newark, New Jersey-licensed classical music outlet WQXR-FM (105.9 MHz). It is a member of NPR and carries local and national news/talk programs. Some programming is simulcast on WNYC-FM and at other times different programming airs on each station. WNYC broadcasts from studios and offices located in the Hudson Square neighborhood in lower Manhattan, and its   transmitter is located in Kearny, New Jersey.

History

Early years (1924–1937)
WNYC is one of the oldest radio stations in New York.  Funds for the establishment of the station were approved on June 2, 1922 by the New York City Board of Estimate and Apportionment.  WNYC made its first official broadcast two years later on July 8, 1924, at 570 AM from the Manhattan Municipal Building using a second-hand transmitter shipped from Brazil. With the commencement of WNYC's operations, the City of New York became one of the first American municipalities to be directly involved in broadcasting.

In 1928 WNYC was forced into a time-sharing arrangement on 570 with WMCA, another pioneering New York radio outlet.  This situation lasted until 1931, when the Federal Radio Commission (a forerunner to today's FCC) moved WNYC to 810 AM.  The frequency move did not help WNYC from an operational standpoint as it now had to share its frequency with the more-powerful WCCO in Minneapolis, limiting WNYC to daytime-only operations, broadcasting from sunrise to sunset.  (AM radio waves travel farther at night and WNYC had to protect WCCO from interference.)

Great Depression and World War II

WNYC's transmitter was moved in 1937 from the Municipal Building to city-owned land at 10 Kent Street in Greenpoint, Brooklyn, as part of a Works Progress Administration project. In 1938 the Municipal Broadcasting System was established by the City of New York to run the station.  For its first 14 years, WNYC had been run by the New York City Commissioner for Bridges, Plant and Structures.  Now, under an agency devoted singularly to its function and with the leadership of new director Morris S. Novik, appointed by Mayor LaGuardia, WNYC became a model public broadcaster. Among its many landmark programs was the annual American Music Festival.

In 1941 the North American Regional Broadcasting Agreement shifted WNYC's frequency a second time, to 830. WCCO was moved to 830 as well, and was given clear-channel authority. WNYC would remain a 1,000-watt outlet for the next 48 years. Later that year, on December 7, WNYC was the first radio station in the United States to announce the Japanese attack on Pearl Harbor. Beginning during World War II, the FCC allowed WNYC to stay on the air a few extra hours in the evening due to the public service it was providing.

The Municipal Broadcasting System (which was renamed the WNYC Communications Group in 1989) helped to form National Public Radio in 1971 and the WNYC stations were among the 90 stations that carried the inaugural broadcast of All Things Considered later that year.

In 1990, as a result of continued interference with WCCO (and a court ruling in WCCO's favor rescinding the WWII-era approval for nighttime operation by WNYC), WNYC moved from 830 kHz to 820 kHz, commenced around-the-clock operations and increased its daytime power to 10,000 watts, while maintaining 1,000 watts at night, to protect WBAP in Fort Worth, Texas; WBAP is also a clear-channel 50,000-watt station but is farther from New York City than Minneapolis. The AM transmitter was moved to Belleville Turnpike in Kearny, New Jersey, sharing three towers with WMCA its former shared-time partner. The Brooklyn transmitter site was decommissioned and is now WNYC Transmitter Park.

The station's ownership by the City meant that it was occasionally subject to the whims of various mayors. As part of a crackdown on prostitution in 1979, then-Mayor Ed Koch tried to use the three WNYC radio and television stations to broadcast the names of "johns" arrested for soliciting. Announcers threatened a walkout over what was casually called the John Hour and station management refused to comply with the idea; after one forced broadcast with city employees reading off the names, it was discontinued.

Independence from the City

Move to new studios

Shortly after assuming the mayoralty in 1994, Rudolph W. Giuliani announced he was considering selling the WNYC stations. Giuliani believed that broadcasting was no longer essential as a municipal service, and that the financial compensation from selling the stations could be used to help the City cover budget shortfalls.  The final decision was made in March 1995: while the City opted to divest WNYC-TV (now WPXN-TV) through a blind auction to commercial buyers, WNYC-AM-FM was sold to the WNYC Foundation for $20 million over a six-year period, far less than what the stations could have been sold for if they were placed on the open market.  While the sale put an end to the occasional political intrusions of the past, it required the WNYC Foundation to embark on a major appeal towards listeners, other foundations, and private benefactors. The station's audience and budget have continued to grow since the split from the City.

The terrorist attacks of September 11, 2001 destroyed WNYC-FM's transmitter at the World Trade Center. WNYC's studios, in the nearby Manhattan Municipal Building, had to be evacuated and station staff was unable to return to its offices for three weeks. The FM signal was knocked off the air for a time. WNYC temporarily moved to studios at National Public Radio's New York bureau in midtown Manhattan, where it broadcast on its still operating AM signal transmitting from towers in Kearny, New Jersey and by a live Internet stream. The stations eventually returned to the Municipal Building.

On June 16, 2008 WNYC moved from its  of rent-free space scattered on eight floors of the Manhattan Municipal Building to a new location at 160 Varick Street, near the Holland Tunnel. The station now occupies three and a half floors of a 12-story former printing building.

The number of recording studios and booths doubled, to 31.. There is a 140-seat, street-level studio for live broadcasts, concerts and public forums and an expansion of the newsroom of over 60 journalists.

Renovation, construction, rent and operating costs for the Varick Street location amounted to $45 million. In addition to raising these funds, WNYC raised money for a one-time fund of $12.5 million to cover the cost of creating 40 more hours of new programming and three new shows. The total cost of $57.5 million for both the move and programming is nearly three times the $20 million the station had to raise over seven years to buy its licenses from the City in 1997.

Past personalities
Past WNYC radio personalities include H. V. Kaltenborn, who hosted radio's first quiz program on WNYC in 1926, the Brooklyn Daily Eagle'''s "Current Events Bee", a forerunner to shows like National Public Radio's Wait Wait... Don't Tell Me! In its early years the station lacked funds for a record library and would borrow albums from record stores around the Manhattan Municipal Building, where its studios were located. Legend has it, a listener began lending classical records to the station and in 1929, WNYC began broadcast of Masterwork Hour, radio's first program of recorded classical music.

Following the U.S. entry into World War II, then-mayor Fiorello H. La Guardia made use of the station every Sunday in his Talk to the People program.  During a lengthy newspaper workers strike, La Guardia also used the WNYC airwaves to read the latest comic strips to local youngsters while they were not available in New York.

Margaret Juntwait, an announcer and classical music host at WNYC for 15 years, left for the Metropolitan Opera in September 2006. Prior to her death in 2015, Juntwait served as announcer for the Met's Saturday afternoon radio broadcasts, the first woman to hold the position and only the third regular announcer of the long-standing broadcast series, which was launched in 1931. John Schaefer, a music show host at WNYC for 20 years, has written liner notes for more than 100 albums, for everyone from Yo-Yo Ma to Terry Riley and was named a "New York influential" by New York Magazine.

Programming

WNYC produces 100 hours a week of its own programming, including nationally syndicated shows such as Studio 360, On the Media, Selected Shorts and Radiolab, as well as local news and interview shows that include The Leonard Lopate Show, Soundcheck and The Brian Lehrer Show. The entire schedule is streamed live over the internet and several shows also air over Sirius and XM Satellite Radio.  As a result, the station receives listener calls from far-flung states and even has international listeners.

WNYC-AM-FM has a local news team of 18 journalists, as well as dozens of producers and other broadcasting professionals.On the Media is a nationally syndicated, weekly one-hour program hosted by Brooke Gladstone and Bob Garfield, formerly of Advertising Age, covering the media and its effect on American culture and society. Many stories investigate how events of the past week were covered by the press. Stories also regularly cover such topics as video news releases, net neutrality, media consolidation, censorship, freedom of the press, spin, and how the media is changing with technology. It won a Peabody Award in 2004.The Brian Lehrer Show is a two-hour weekday talk show covering local and national current events and social issues hosted by Brian Lehrer, a former anchor and reporter for NBC Radio Network. It won a Peabody Award in 2007 "for facilitating reasoned conversation about critical issues and opening it up to everyone within earshot."

WNYC broadcasts the major daily news programs produced by NPR, including Morning Edition and All Things Considered, as well as the BBC World Service and selected programs from Public Radio Exchange including This American Life and A Prairie Home Companion''.

The PBS NewsHour is a syndicated news program anchored by Judy Woodruff that airs on more than 350 TV stations and many NPR affiliates. Interviews, documentary reports and national headlines are analyzed. Since its launch in 1975, at least 20 of its headlines have been Peabody Awards recipients, two have become finalists for the Pulitzer Prize for Explanatory Reading, and 21 have received nominations for the News & Documentary Emmy Awards.

Listenership and new media
WNYC has been an early adopter of new technologies including HD radio, live audio streaming, and podcasting. RSS feeds and email newsletters link to archived audio of individual program segments. WNYC also makes some of its programming available on Sirius XM satellite radio.

See also 
WNYC-FM (93.9), WNYC's sister station
WPXN-TV (channel 31, formerly WNYC-TV)
Media in New York City

References

External links
 
FCC History Cards for WNYC 

 New York Public radio website
 Broadcast Schedule (New York Public Radio)
 WNYC historical profile (1978) at NY Radio News
 Porter Anderson announces Challenge Grant for WQXR's Q2 Music(2011) by Victoria Mixon

NPR member stations
Peabody Award winners
Radio stations established in 1924
NYC
NPR member networks
New York Public Radio
Hudson Square
1924 establishments in New York City
News and talk radio stations in the United States